Anaesthetis anatolica is a species of beetle in the family Cerambycidae. It was described by Holzschuh in 1969. It is known from Turkey.

References

Desmiphorini
Beetles described in 1969